Patrick Baum may refer to:

 Patrick Baum, member of Adair (band)
 Patrick Baum (table tennis) (born 1987), table tennis player from Germany